Dhoomketu (The Comet) is a 1949 action adventure film directed by Homi Wadia. Made under the Basant Pictures banner, the music was composed by A. Karim with lyrics by Rajjan and A. Karim. Raja Sandow an early hero and director of films played a supporting role in this film. The film starred Fearless Nadia, John Cawas, Sona Chatterji, Dalpat, Boman Shroff, Ram Singh and Raja Sandow.

The setting is soon after India's Independence and Inspector Comet has been put in charge of getting rid of black-marketeers.

Plot
Seth Dharmadas is a respectable man in society who is shown as a humanitarian helping the needy women of society. However, his evil deeds are not known to many. He is one of the biggest black-marketeers in a time when the grain is scarce. Inspector Dayal is helped by his daughter Shanti and Inspector Comet in finding the guilty. When Dayal gets near the truth he is killed off by Dharamdas. Mohini Comet's fiancée and Shanti along with others help in catching the villain after a frantic round of action and chase scenes.

Cast
 Fearless Nadia
 John Cawas
 Sona Chatterji
 Dalpat
 Boman Shroff
 Ram Singh
 Raja Sandow
 Habib

Music

References

External links

1940s Hindi-language films
Indian black-and-white films
Films directed by Homi Wadia
1940s action adventure films
Indian action adventure films